The canton of Fontenay-le-Comte is an administrative division of the Vendée department, western France. Its borders were modified at the French canton reorganisation which came into effect in March 2015. Its seat is in Fontenay-le-Comte.

It consists of the following communes:
 
Auchay-sur-Vendée
Benet
Bouillé-Courdault
Damvix
Doix-lès-Fontaines
Faymoreau
Fontenay-le-Comte
Foussais-Payré
Le Langon
Liez
Longèves
Maillé
Maillezais
Le Mazeau
Mervent
Montreuil
L'Orbrie
Pissotte
Puy-de-Serre
Rives-d'Autise
Saint-Hilaire-des-Loges
Saint-Martin-de-Fraigneau
Saint-Michel-le-Cloucq
Saint-Pierre-le-Vieux
Saint-Sigismond
Les Velluire-sur-Vendée
Vix
Xanton-Chassenon

References

Cantons of Vendée